Aleksandar Šušnjar (born 19 August 1995) is an Australian professional footballer who plays as a defender for Macarthur FC in the A-League.

Club career

Born in Perth, Šušnjar made his senior debut in Europe, playing with Lithuanian side Ekranas in A Lyga seasons 2013 and 2014. Then he returned to Australia and played with Perth SC in the 2015 National Premier Leagues. Next he signed with Lietava Jonava playing with them in the 2016 A Lyga. Romanian Liga I club Gaz Metan Mediaș signed him and Šušnjar played with them until the winter-break when he moved to Czech Republic and joined FK Teplice. A year later, another Czech First League signed him, Mladá Boleslav. On 24 July 2018, he joined MŠK Žilina on a six-month loan deal. Susnjar then moved to Busan IPark in South Korea's K League on 28 February 2019.

In October 2020, Šušnjar joined A-League expansion club Macarthur FC.

International career

Šušnjar initially represented Serbia, having made one appearance in 2011 for the Serbian U-17 side. However, by January 2018, he already called the attention of the Australian FA and made a debut for the Australian U23 team.

He received his first senior call up when he was selected in Bert van Marwijk's first Socceroos squad for the March 2018 friendlies. He made the debut for the Australian national team in a friendly game against Norway played on 23 March 2018.

Personal life

In addition to his native English, Šušnjar can also speak Serbian, Lithuanian, Czech and can get by in Romanian. He has been often confused with same named Serbian footballer, who previously played with Donji Srem in the Serbian First League, along with older brother, Milan.

References

External links
 
 
 
 

Living people
1995 births
Soccer players from Perth, Western Australia
Australian soccer players
Australia international soccer players
Australia youth international soccer players
Australian expatriate sportspeople in South Korea
Serbian footballers
Serbia youth international footballers
Australian people of Serbian descent
Expatriate footballers in Romania
Expatriate footballers in Lithuania
Expatriate footballers in the Czech Republic
Expatriate footballers in Slovakia
Expatriate footballers in South Korea
FK Ekranas players
FK Jonava players
CS Gaz Metan Mediaș players
FK Teplice players
FK Mladá Boleslav players
MŠK Žilina players
Busan IPark players
Macarthur FC players
A Lyga players
Liga I players
Czech First League players
Slovak Super Liga players
K League 2 players
Association football defenders
Australian expatriate sportspeople in Romania
Australian expatriate sportspeople in Slovakia
Australian expatriate sportspeople in the Czech Republic
Australian expatriate sportspeople in Lithuania
Australian expatriate soccer players